This article details the fixtures and results of the UAE national football team in 1981. 

The national side were invited to the 1981 Merdeka Cup run annually by the Malaysian football federation in honour of the Hari Merdeka which is a national day of Malaysia commemorating the independence of the Federation of Malaya from British colonial rule. This gave the national team an opportunity to play competitive football against other Asian nations generally from outside of the Persian Gulf region.

Schedule

1981 Merdeka Cup

1981 Merdeka Cup

1981 Merdeka Cup

1981 Merdeka Cup

1981 Merdeka Cup

Friendly

Friendly

Friendly

Friendly

National team
National team
1982
United
United